Virgin Snow is a 2007 South Korean–Japanese film.

It may also refer to:

 Virgin Snow (album), 1988 Cantopop album by Leslie Cheung
 Virgin Snow, 1980s travel venture by Virgin Group
 "Virgin Snow", 1990 song by Japanese band Ribbon
 "Virgin Snow", 1997 song by Jordan Rudess from the album Secrets of the Muse
 Virgin snow is also a skiing term